The Donca Matic Singalongs is the second album by Norwegian big beat duo Xploding Plastix, released on Columbia Records in 2003. It features guest vocals by Eek-A-Mouse and Sarah Cracknell.

Track listing
"Donca Matic" - 5:06
"Geigerteller" - 4:22
"The Cave In Proper" - 4:39
"The Snarling Amble" (Feat. Eek-A-Mouse) - 4:45
"Sunset Spirals" (Feat. Sarah Cracknell) - 3:32
"Tripwire" - 4:41
"One Bullet Fits All" - 5:30
"The Famous Biting Guy" - 3:44
"Dizzy Blonde" - 5:32
"Cashmere Tarmac" - 4:20
"Huncher" - 3:47

2003 albums
Xploding Plastix albums